Winfield Scott (February 26, 1837 – October 19, 1910) was an American Baptist minister, military officer, and politician.  Shortly after graduating from seminary and taking his first job as a pastor, he left his church to lead a company during the American Civil War.  Injuries sustained on the battlefield eventually led to his discharge from the military.  Following the war, Scott moved to Kansas where he grew one church and established several others.  He continued in ministerial and evangelical efforts in Colorado and California before becoming a U.S. Army chaplain.  After retiring from the army, Scott moved to the Salt River Valley where he founded and was active in the early promotion of Scottsdale, Arizona.  Despite being an ordained minister, Scott preferred the style "Chaplain, U.S.A." to "Reverend".

Biography
Scott was born to James Burt and Margaret E. (Covert) Scott in West Novi, Michigan, on February 26, 1837.  His family moved to Interlaken, New York when he was a child. Scott was baptized into the Baptist church in February 1853.  He graduated from the University of Rochester in 1859 and Rochester Theological Seminary in 1861.  Scott married Helen Louise Brown on July 13, 1859.  The union produced four daughters. Scott's daughter Minnie was the wife of brigadier general Frank Herman Albright.

A Baptist church in Syracuse, New York called Scott as their pastor following his graduation from seminary.  He left this position in 1862 to raise a company to fight in the American Civil War and was commissioned a captain in the U.S. Volunteers.  Scott became known as the "Fighting Parson" while he commanded Company C, 126th New York Volunteers.  He was wounded during Battle of Harpers Ferry and twice each during the battles at Gettysburg and Spotsylvania Court House.  As a result of his injuries, Scott was medically discharged from the military on September 23, 1864.

Following the war, Scott became pastor for the First Baptist Church of Leavenworth, Kansas.  During his 6 years in Leavenworth, his church grew from 19 to 250 members and he organized churches in three nearby communities.  The city of Winfield, Kansas, was named in Scott's honor after he promised to build a church there.
Scott moved to Denver, Colorado, where he served as a pastor January 1872 to September 1875.  He moved to California in late 1875 and was editor of Evangel from February through October 1876.  Scott was called to the pastorate of a church in Los Angeles in 1877.  In 1878 he was Associate Pastor Metropolitan Church in San Francisco.  The year he was in San Francisco also saw him receive a Doctor of Divinity from a California university.  Scott served at churches in Petaluma and Oakland before becoming pastor of a church in San Jose, California, in February 1880.

Scott became an U.S. Army Chaplain in 1882, a position he held til 1893.  He was initially served at Fort Canby and Fort Stevens before transferring to Angel Island in 1885.   In February 1888, Scott visited the Salt River Valley.  Valley leaders hoped the chaplain would help promote the area.  Scott was so impressed he purchased  of land in the valley for US$2.50/acre.  The plot he chose was abutted the soon to be completed Arizona Canal.  Scott transferred to Fort Huachuca in 1893 and made frequent visits to his property.  His brother, George Washington Scott, meanwhile moved to Arizona Territory.  There he cleared the land of brush and began planted citrus orchards.  Scott moved to his homestead in 1893 on terminal leave.  Health problems caused by his old war wounds prompted his retirement.  Formal retirement occurred on March 26, 1889.

As the first person to grow peanuts, citrus trees, and grapes in the Salt River Valley, Scott advocated the area's potential as a health resort as well as its agricultural potential.  A couple years after Scott's arrival there were a number of families living near his ranch.  Scott and his wife founded the Arizona Baptist Foundation and became part of the area's local leadership.  In 1896 the area added a school and the settlement around Scott's ranch was officially named Scottsdale.

Scott's influence extended beyond just Scottsdale.  In 1897, Governor Myron H. McCord appointed him  Chaplain of the Arizona National Guard.  He was elected to represent Maricopa County in the lower house during the 1899 session of the territorial legislature.  During the session, he was a leader in efforts to limit gambling and the liquor trade but was unsuccessful in efforts to pass legislation limiting either.  As part of his efforts, he announced his intentions to give a three-hour speech on the evils of gambling before the legislature but the session adjourned for the day five minutes after he began his speech.  Ministerially, Scott was pastor of the Lone Star Baptist Church (now First Baptist Church) in Prescott from September 1899 till August 1900.  He organized churches in Naco, Arizona and Douglas, Arizona in 1902 and was named Chaplain in chief of Grand Army of the Republic in 1903.  Scott was appointed to the Arizona Board of Regents in 1902 and served as Chancellor (board chairman) the next year.  In 1906, Scott made an unsuccessful run to the Arizona Territorial Legislature.

In 1909, Scott moved to San Diego, California.  While in Phoenix, Arizona, he became ill and underwent surgery to treat a strangulated hernia shortly before his death on October 19, 1910.  Scott was buried at Mount Hope Cemetery in San Diego.  San Diego's Scott Memorial Baptist Church (now Shadow Mountain Community Church) is named in his honor.

References

 
 
 
 
 
 
 
 

1837 births
1910 deaths
People from Oakland County, Michigan
People of New York (state) in the American Civil War
University of Rochester alumni
Members of the Arizona Territorial Legislature
American city founders
19th-century Baptist ministers from the United States
United States Army chaplains
Union Army officers
Colgate Rochester Crozer Divinity School alumni
19th-century American politicians
Baptists from Michigan
Burials at Mount Hope Cemetery (San Diego)
Grand Army of the Republic officials
Military personnel from Michigan